Kevin Shibilski (born June 28, 1961) is a businessman and former politician who served as a Democratic State Senator from Wisconsin's 24th District from 1995 to 2002. He previously served as the Register of Deeds, representing Portage County, Wisconsin. He also served on the Portage County Board of Supervisors and as Wisconsin's Secretary of Tourism. In September 2020, Shibilski was indicted on federal charges of fraud, illegal disposal of electronic waste, and tax evasion. Shibilski's attorney said his client had been the victim of fraud committed by business partners.

Early life and education
Born in Stevens Point, Wisconsin, Shibilski graduated from Stevens Point Area Senior High School and went on to graduate with a B.A. in English from the University of Wisconsin–Stevens Point. He is or has been a member of the Izaak Walton League, Wisconsin Bowhunters Association, Whitetails Unlimited, Tomorrow River Lions Club, Ducks Unlimited, Portage County Red Cross board of directors, and Portage County United Way.

Political career

Shibilski served in the Portage County Board of Supervisors 1982(?)-1987. He then served as Register of Deeds of Portage County 1987-1995.

Wisconsin Legislature
Shibilski served as a member of the Wisconsin State Senate from 1995 to 2002.

Cabinet Secretary and later career

Shibilski was appointed as Wisconsin's Secretary of Tourism in 2003. One of his first acts as secretary was to declare a "no snow emergency" when the state experienced a particularly poor winter snow season, dramatically impacting the state's economy. He stepped down later that year to become Vice President of Wisconsin Public Finance for Stifel, Nicolaus and Company.

Potential U.S. House candidacies

In 2010, Shibilski seriously considered a run against Republican nominee Sean Duffy for Wisconsin's 7th congressional district, then held by retiring Dave Obey. Duffy went on to defeat Shibilski's successor in the state senate, Julie Lassa, with a strong showing in the November 2010 general election.

Shibilski was reported to have considered a run for the 7th congressional district in 2012 as well.

Federal indictment
In September 2020, Shibulski was indicted by a grand jury on federal charges of wire fraud, illegal disposal of hazardous electronic waste, and tax fraud. In May 2022 he was convicted of fraud.

References

External links
 Profile at Vote Smart
 Profile at Our Campaigns

1968 births
Living people
County supervisors in Wisconsin
Democratic Party Wisconsin state senators
People from Stevens Point, Wisconsin
University of Wisconsin–Stevens Point alumni
People from Merrill, Wisconsin
20th-century American politicians
21st-century American politicians
Wisconsin politicians convicted of crimes